Holiday in Brazil (also released as Brazilliance Vol. 2) is an album by saxophonist Bud Shank with arrangements by Laurindo Almeida released on the Pacific Jazz label.

Reception

AllMusic rated the album with 3 stars.

Track listing
All compositions by Laurindo Almeida, except as indicated.
 "Simpatica" (Stanley Wilson) - 2:55
 "Rio Rhapsody" (Laurindo Almeida, Radamés Gnattali) - 3:57
 "Nocturno"  3:29
 "Little Girl Blue" (Richard Rodgers, Lorenz Hart) - 2:37
 "Choro in "A"" - 2:30
 "Mood Antigua" (Bud Shank) - 4:02
 "The Color of Her Hair" - 1:58
 "Lonely" (Shank, Almeida) - 3:53
 "I Didn't Know What Time It Was" (Rodgers, Hart) - 2:47
 "Carioca Hills" - 3:01

Personnel 
Bud Shank - alto saxophone, flute
Laurindo Almeida - guitar
Gary Peacock - bass
Chuck Flores - drums

References 

1959 albums
World Pacific Records albums
Bud Shank albums